is a Japanese football forward who currently plays for Nankatsu SC.

Career

Kashima Antlers
Akasaki joined the Kashima Antlers on loan from University of Tsukuba on 17 April 2013. Two days after his loan expired, the Antlers signed Akasaki on a free transfer. Akasaki spent two and a half years more at the club, scoring 23 goals in 92 appearances.

Gamba Osaka
On 12 March 2017, Akasaki was loaned out to Gamba Osaka. In the time he spent there, Akasaki scored 2 goals in 19 appearances.

Kawasaki Frontale
On 1 February 2018, Akasaki moved to Kawasaki Frontale on a free transfer.

Career statistics
Updated to 21 February 2019.

1Includes Suruga Bank Championship, J. League Championship and FIFA Club World Cup appearances.

Honours

Kashima Antlers
Suruga Bank Championship: 2013
J. League Cup: 2015
J.League: 2016
Emperor's Cup: 2016
Japanese Super Cup: 2017

References

External links

Profile at Kashima Antlers
Articles on Akasaki

1991 births
Living people
University of Tsukuba alumni
Association football people from Kagoshima Prefecture
Japanese footballers
J1 League players
J2 League players
Kashima Antlers players
Gamba Osaka players
Kawasaki Frontale players
Nagoya Grampus players
Vegalta Sendai players
Association football forwards
Universiade gold medalists for Japan
Universiade medalists in football
Medalists at the 2011 Summer Universiade
Medalists at the 2013 Summer Universiade